Greece has many islands, with estimates ranging from somewhere around 1,200 to 6,000, depending on the minimum size to take into account. The number of inhabited islands is variously cited as between 166 and 227.

The largest Greek island by both area and population is Crete, located at the southern edge of the Aegean Sea. The second largest island in area is Euboea or Evvia, which is separated from the mainland by the 60m-wide Euripus Strait, and is administered as part of the Central Greece region. After the third and fourth largest Greek islands, Lesbos and Rhodes, the rest of the islands are two-thirds of the area of Rhodes, or smaller.

The Greek islands are traditionally grouped into the following clusters: the Argo-Saronic Islands in the Saronic Gulf near Athens; the Cyclades, a large but dense collection occupying the central part of the Aegean Sea; the North Aegean islands, a loose grouping off the west coast of Turkey; the Dodecanese, another loose collection in the southeast between Crete and Turkey; the Sporades, a small tight group off the coast of Euboea; and the Ionian Islands, chiefly located to the west of the mainland in the Ionian Sea. Crete with its surrounding islets and Euboea are traditionally excluded from this grouping.

This article excludes the Peloponnese, which has technically been an island since the construction of the Corinth Canal in 1893, but is rarely considered to be an island due to its artificial origins.

Islands of Greece by size

The following are the 40 largest Greek islands listed by surface area.

Islands of Greece by population

Islands of the Aegean Sea

Argo-Saronic Islands

This list includes Argo-Saronic islands, which are located in the Saronic Gulf. The largest Argo-Saronic island is Salamis. The main islands are in bold. Uninhabited islands are indicated, including those that may have been inhabited in the past:
 
 Aegina, 
 Agios Georgios (uninhabited), 
 Agios Georgios Salaminos (St. George's Island, uninhabited), 
 Agios Ioannis Diaporion (uninhabited)
 Agios Thomas Diaporion (uninhabited), 
 Agistri, 
 Alexandros Hydras,  
 Atalanti Island, 
 Dia (uninhabited)
 Dokos, 
 Falkonera (uninhabited), 
 Fleves (uninhabited), 
 Hydra, 
 Katramoniso (Nisís Idhroúsa, uninhabited), 
 Kyra Aiginis (Nisída Kyrá) (uninhabited), 
 Laousses Islets (Nísoi Laoúses, uninhabited), 
 Leros Salaminos (uninhabited), 
 Modi Porou (uninhabited), 
 Moni Aiginas (uninhabited), 
 Patroklos (uninhabited), 
 Pera Island (Arta), 
 Platia (uninhabited), 
 Platia Aeginis (uninhabited), 
 Poros, 
 Psili (uninhabited)
 Psyttaleia (uninhabited), 
 Revythousa (uninhabited), 
 Romvi (Nisida Romvi) (uninhabited), 
 Salamis, 
 Spetses, 
 Spetsopoula (uninhabited), 
 Stavronisi Hydras (uninhabited), 
 Trikeri Hydras (uninhabited), 
 Velopoula (Nisída Velopoúla) (uninhabited), 
 Ypsili Diaporion (uninhabited)
 Ypsili Argolidos (uninhabited)

Cretan islands
The two lists below show the islands, islets, and rocks that surround the island of Crete that are in the Aegean Sea or Libyan Sea.

Cretan islands of the Aegean Sea

 Afendis Christos, 
 Agia Varvara, 
 Agioi Apostoloi, 
 Agioi Pandes, 
 Agioi Theodoroi, 
 Agios Nikolaos, 
 Agriomandra, 
 Anavatis, 
 Arnaouti, 
 Avgo (uninhabited islet), 
 Crete, 
 Daskaleia (uninhabited islet), 
 Dia (Zeus, uninhabited), 
 Diapori, 
 Dionysades (group of islands), 
 Gianysada, 
 Dragonada, 
 Paximada, 
 Paximadaki, 
 Elasa, 
 Ftena Trachylia, 
 Glaronisi, 
 Gramvoussa, 
 Agria Gramvousa, 
 Imeri Gramvousa, 
 Grandes (group of islands), 
 Kalydon (Spinalonga), 
 Karavi (uninhabited), 
 Karga (uninhabited), 
 Katergo (uninhabited), 
 Kavaloi (three uninhabited islands), 
 Anavatis,  
 Kavallos, 
 Kefali, 
 Kolokytha, 
 Koursaroi, 
 Kyriamadi (Peninsula), 
 Lazaretta, 
 Leon (Islet), 
 Mavros (Uninhabited islet), 
 Megatzedes (Uninhabited islet), 
 Mochlos, 
 Nikolos, 
 Palaiosouda (Islet), 
 Peristeri (Islet), 
 Peristerovrachoi (Uninhabited rocks), 
 Petalida (Islet), 
 Petalouda (Uninhabited islet), 
 Pontikaki (Uninhabited islet), 
 Pondikonisi (Uninhabited islet), 
 Praso Kissamou (Islet), 
 Prosfora (Uninhabited islet), 
 Pseira, 
 Sideros (Uninhabited rock), 
 Souda (Islet), 
 Valenti (Rock), 
 Vryonisi (Uninhabited islet),

Cretan islands of the Libyan Sea

Islands on the south coast of Crete are considered in the Libyan Sea.

 Agia Eirini, 
 Ammoudi tous Volakous, 
 Artemis (Uninhabited islet), 
 Aspros Volakas (rock), 
 Chrysi (uninhabited), 
 Elafonisi, 
 Fotia (Uninhabited islet), 
 Gaidouronisi (Uninhabited), 
 Gavdopoula, 
 Gavdos (Southernmost point of Greece), 
 Koufonisi (Lefki) (Uninhabited islet), 
 Loutro (Rocky islet), 
 Makroulo (Uninhabited islet), 
 Marmaro (Uninhabited islet), 
 Mavros Volakas (Large rock), 
 Megalonisi (Uninhabited islet), 
 Mikronisi (Islet), 
 Papadoplaka (Reef islet), 
 Paximadia (Two small uninhabited islands), 
 Prasonisi, Gavdou (Islet), 
 Prasonisi, Rethymno (Islet), 
 Psarocharako (Rock), 
 Psyllos (Uninhabited islet), 
 Schistonisi (Islet), 
 Strongyli (Uninhabited islet), 
 Thetis (Islet), 
 Trachilos (Uninhabited islet), 
 Trafos (Islet), 
 Treis Volakous (Rocks),

Cyclades islands

The Cyclades islands comprise around 220 islands and islets. The main islands are indicated in bold below.

 Agios Nikolaos (Macheres), 
 Amorgos, 
 Ananes, 
 Anafi, 
 Andros, 
 Aniros (Anydros)
 Ano Antikeros
 Antimilos, 
 Antiparos, 
 Anydros Amorgou
 Askania, 
 Christiana (uninhabited), 
 Delos, 
 Despotiko (uninhabited), 
 Donousa, 
 Eschati, 
 Folegandros, 
 Glaronisi, 
 Gyaros, 
 Hristiana
 Htapodia Mykonou
 Ios, 
 Iraklia, 
 Kalogiros
 Kardiotissa, 
 Kato Antikeros, 
 Kato Koufonisi, 
 Kea, 
 Keros, 
 Kimolos, 
 Kitriani, 
 Koufonisia, 
 Kramvonisi
 Kythnos, 
 Liadi Island, 
 Makares, 
 Makronissos, 
 Megalo, 
 Milos, 
 Mykonos, 
 Naxos, 
 Nea Kameni, 
 Nikouria, 
 Nisida Prasini, 
 Ofidousa,  
 Pahia Anaphis
 Palea Kameni, 
 Paros, 
 Polyaigos, 
 Rhineia, 
 Saliagos, 
 Santorini (Thera), 
 Schoinoussa, 
 Serifopoula, 
 Serifos, 
 Sifnos, 
 Sikinos, 
 Skilonisi, 
 Stroggyli Parou, 
 Syros, 
 Therasia, 
 Tinos, 
 Vous, 
 Vrachoi Bouvais,

Dodecanese islands

There are 164 total Dodecanese Islands of which 26 are inhabited.  There are 12 main islands, as listed in bold below:

 Agathonissi, 
 Agioi Theodoroi Halkis
 Agreloussa
 Alimia, 
 Antitilos
 Anydros Patmou
 Arefoussa
 Arhangelos
 Arkoi, 
 Armathia, 
 Astakida
 Astypalaia, 
 Faradonesia
 Farmakonisi, 
 Fokionissia
 Fragos
 Gaidourosnissi Tilou
 Glaros Kinarou
 Gyali, 
 Halavra
 Halki, 
 Hiliomodi Patmou
 Hondro
 Htenies
 Imia (uninhabited), 
 Kalavros Kalymnou
 Kalolimnos, 
 Kalovolos
 Kalymnos, 
 Kamilonisi
 Kandeloussa
 Karavolas Rodhou
 Karpathos, 
 Kasos, 
 Kastellorizo (Megisti), 
 Kinaros, 
 Kos, 
 Koubelonisi
 Kouloundros
 Kouloura Leipson
 Kounoupoi
 Koutsomytis
 Leipsoi, 
 Leros, 
 Levitha, 
 Makronisi Leipson
 Makronissi Kasou
 Makry Aspronisi Leipson
 Makry Halkis
 Marathos, 
 Marmaras
 Mavra Levithas
 Megalo Aspronisi Leipson
 Megalo Glaronisi
 Megalo Sofrano
 Mesonisi Seirinas
 Mikro Glaronisi, 
 Mikro Sofrano, 
 Nerónisi, 
 Nimos, 
 Nisídes Adelfoí, 
 Nisyros, 
 Paheia Nisyrou
 Patmos, 
 Pergoussa
 Piganoussa
 Pitta
 Plati Kasou
 Plati Pserimou
 Plati Symis
 Pontikoussa
 Prasonissi Rodhou
 Prasouda
 Pserimos, 
 Ro, 
 Rhodes, 
 Safonidi
 Saria,  
 Seirina
 Sesklio
 Stroggyli
 Strongyli Megistis (Easternmost point of Greece), 
 Strongyli Kritinias
 Strongyli Kasou
 Symi, 
 Syrna, 
 Telendos, 
 Tilos, 
 Tragonisi
 Zaforas,

Euboea and surrounding islands

 Atalanti (uninhabited), 
 Euboea, 
 Hersonisi
 Kavalliani (uninhabited), 
 Lichades, 
 Lithari
 Mandilou
 Monoliá, 
 Megalos Petalios
 Petalioi (10 small uninhabited islands/islets), 
 Stouronisi,

North Aegean islands

 
 Agios Efstratios, 
 Chios, 
 Icaria, 
 Lesbos, 
 Lemnos, 
 Oinousses, 
 Pasas, 
 Psara, 
 Antipsara, 
 Samos, 
 Samiopoula, 
 Fournoi Korseon
 Agios Minas
 Thymaina

There are also two North Aegean islands in the Thracian Sea:

 Samothrace, 
 Thassos,

Sporades islands

The 30 islands in the Sporades are listed below with the four major islands in bold.  The largest Sporades island is Skyros.
 
 Adelfoi Islets, 
 Agios Georgios Skopelou
 Alonissos, 
 Arkos (Skiathos Municipality), 
 Aspronisi (Skiathos Municipality)
 Dasia
 Erinia (Rineia Skyrou), 
 Gioura, 
 Grammeza, 
 Korakas Alonissou
 Kyra Panagia, 
 Lekhoussa, 
 Manolas Alonissou
 Maragos (Skiathos Municipality)
 Peristera, 
 Piperi, 
 Polemika Alonissou
 Praso Skantzouras
 Psathoura, 
 Repi, 
 Sarakino, 
 Skandili, 
 Skantzoura, 
 Skiathos ( in Municipality), 
 Skopelos, 
 Skyropoula (Skyros Municipality), 
 Skyros, 
 Tsougria (Skiathos Municipality), 
 Troulonisi (Skiathos Municipality)
 Tsougriaki (Skiathos Municipality)
 Valaxa,

Ionian Sea islands

Islands in the Ionian Sea are listed below.  The seven largest and most popular islands are listed in bold.
 
 Antikythera, 
 Antipaxos, 
 Arkoudi, 
 Atokos, 
 Cephalonia, 
 Corfu, 
 Diaplo, 
 Echinades
 Apasa, 
 Drakonera, 
 Filippos, 
 Girovaris or Gkravaris, 
 Kalogiros, 
 Karlonisi, 
 Kouneli or Makropoula, 
 Lamprinos, 
 Makri, 
 Modio or Modi, 
 Oxeia, 
 Petalas, 
 Pistros, 
 Pontikos, 
 Praso, 
 Provati, 
 Sofía, 
 Soros,  
 Tsakalonisi, 
 Vromonas, 
 Elafonissos, 
 Ereikoussa, 
 Ithaca, 
 Kalamos, 
 Kastos, 
 Kravia, 
 Kythira, 
 Kythros, 
 Lazaretto, 
 Lefkada, 
 Madouri (Uninhabited), 
 Makropoúla, 
 Mathraki, 
 Meganisi, 
 Modia Islets, 
 Nisída Ágios Nikólaos, 
 Omfori (Uninhabited, private), 
 Othonoi (westernmost point of Greece), 
 Paxi, 
 Provati, 
 Proti, 
 Sapientza, 
 Schiza (Uninhabited), 
 Skorpios, 
 Skorpidi (Private), 
 Sparti Lefkados, 
 Sphacteria, 
 Strofades, 
 Thilia, 
 Vido, 
 Zakynthos,

Islets close to mainland 
The following islands are close to the mainland and not part of a sea:

 Alatas Trikeriou, 
 Ammouliani (Chalkidiki), 
 Antitrikeri (Thessaly) 
 Kelyfos, 
 Paleo Trikeri (Thessaly), 
 Trizonia island (Central Greece),

Islands not in the sea

Lake and river islands

 Agios Achilleios (Small Prespa Lake), 
 Ioannina Island (Lake Pamvotida), 
 Vidronisi (Small Prespa Lake), 
 Anonymous islet (Limnothálassa Pápas lagoon, Western Achaia),

Islands in an island
 Marathi Island (Marathi Lake (reservoir) in Mykonos),

Lagoon islands

Aitoliko Lagoon
Aitoliko, 
 Missolonghi Lagoon
 Dolmas
 Kleisova, 
 Komma, 
 Prokopanistos
 Schinias
 Tourlida, 
 Vasiladi,

See also 

 Geography of Greece
 Ionian Islands
 List of Aegean Islands
 Lists of islands
 List of islands of Turkey
 List of islands in the Mediterranean

Notes

References 

 
 
 , Barrington Atlas of the Greek and Roman World

External links 
 

Geography of Greece

Greece
Lists of landforms of Greece